Jess David Spurlock (born November 18, 1959) is an author, illustrator, editor, and artist's-rights advocate best known as the founder of Vanguard Productions, a publisher of art books, graphic novels, and prints.

Early life
J. David Spurlock was born on November 18, 1959 in Memphis, Tennessee. He moved to Dallas, Texas in 1973.

Career
He has taught art at The University of Texas at Arlington, the Joe Kubert School, and the School of Visual Arts in New York. He has served as a president of the Dallas Society of Illustrators.

As a comic book artist, he co-penciled and inked the alternative press comic Sparkplug #1 (March 1993), from Heroic Publishing's Hero Comics imprint, credited as David Spurlock. The following year he contributed a text page to a Dallas, Texas, tribute comic honoring industry legend Jack Kirby, who had recently died.

Spurlock founded Vanguard Productions in 1993, although he had used that name, in conjunction with Sparrowlake Enterprises, to self-publish the comic book Badge #1 in 1981. The company initially had been founded to publish a comics anthology, Tales from the Edge, with 15 issues released as of 2010. The company then moved into art books, biographies and eventually graphic novels, including Neal Adams' Monsters (2003), (originally serialized in the comics anthology series Echoes of Future Past, published by Adams' Continuity Studios), with four additional story pages plus additional Adams material. DC Comics editor Julius Schwartz, an architect of the Silver Age of Comic Books, said "Spurlock's line of books serve as the vanguard of Silver Age comics histories." Other comics magazines and collections published by Vanguard beginning in 2001 include Space Cowboy, Jesse James Classic Western Collection, Steve Ditko: Space Wars and Wally Wood's The Complete Lunar Tunes and The Wizard King.

In an article on the Fort Worth, Texas, comics artist Pat Boyette, Don Mangus, who assisted Spurlock during this time, wrote of the early Vanguard comics that,

Philanthropic works
Spurlock co-created the Wally Wood Scholarship Fund with Wood's brother, Glenn Wood, for students of the School of Visual Arts. In a joint venture with Marvel Comics and Diamond Comic Distributors, Vanguard Productions in 2002 sponsored artist Jim Steranko's "The Spirit of America" benefit print, created to fund an art scholarship "for victims of anti-American terrorism".

In 2008, Spurlock, with artist and publisher Neal Adams and the David S. Wyman Institute for Holocaust Studies Arts & Letters Council, spearheaded a petition campaign in which over 450 comic book creators and cartoonists urged the Auschwitz-Birkenau State Museum to return to artist Dina Babbitt seven portraits she was forced to paint in the Auschwitz death camp in 1944.

Awards and nominations
Vanguard Productions' Hal Foster: Prince of Illustrators, Father of the Adventure Strip was a finalist for a 2003 Independent Publisher Book Award (the IPPY) in the "Popular Culture" category. It was nominated for a 2002 Eisner Award for "Best Comics-Related Book".

Vanguard's Wally's World: The Brilliant Life and Tragic Death of Wally Wood, the World's Second-Best Comic Book Artist (2004), by Spurlock and Steve Sarger, was nominated for a 2007 Eisner Award for "Best Comics-Related Book".

The original self-published limited edition of The Art of Nick Cardy by John Coates (Coates Publishing, 1999), which was reissued in a wider edition by Vanguard in 2001, was nominated for a 2000 Eisner Award for "Best Comics-Related Book".

In March 2011, he was named Inkwell Awards Special Ambassador. He still holds that recognition at present.

Bibliography as author, editor and/or publisher
Steranko, Jim. Steranko: Graphic Prince of Darkness (1998)
Spurlock, J. David, ed. The Al Williamson Sketchbook (1998): 
Schumer, Arlen, compiler, The Sketch Book a.k.a. Neal Adams: The Sketch Book (1999): 
Spurlock, J. David, and Bill Pearson, compilers. Wally Wood Sketchbook (2001): 
Infantino, Carmine, with J. David Spurlock. The Amazing World of Carmine Infantino (2000): 
Pratt, George, compiler. Jeffrey Jones Sketchbook (2000): 
Motter, Dean, and J. David Spurlock, compilers. Echoes: Drawings of Michael William Kaluta (2000): 
Coates, John. The Art of Nick Cardy (2001): . Originally Coates Publishing limited edition, 1999
Spurlock, J. David, and John Buscema. John Buscema Sketchbook (2001): 
Zeno, Eddy. Curt Swan: A Life in Comics (2002): 
Kane, Brian. Hal Foster: Prince of Illustrators, Father of the Adventure Strip (2002): 
Adams, Neal. Monsters a.k.a. Neal Adams Monsters (2003): 
Spurlock, J. David, and John Romita. John Romita Sketchbook (2002): 
RGK: The Art of Roy G. Krenkel (hardcover 2004; trade paperback 2005): 
Sarger, Steve, and J. David Spurlock. Wally's World: The Brilliant Life and Tragic Death of Wally Wood, the World's Second-Best Comic Book Artist (2004): 
The Thrilling Comic Book Cover Art of Alex Schomburg (2004): 
Spurlock, J. David, compiler. Grand Master of Adventure Art: The Drawings of J. Allen St. John (2005): 
Gammill, Kerry, and J. David Spurlock, eds. Famous Monster Movie Art of Basil Gogos (2005): 
Korshak, Stephen D. The Paintings of J. Allen St. John: Grand Master of Fantasy (2008 limited edition): 
Spurlock, J. David, compiler. Mythos: Fantasy Art Realms of Frank Brunner'' (2007):

Footnotes

References
Michigan State University Libraries, Special Collections Division: Reading Room Index to the Comic Art Collection

External links

 

Comic book publishers (people)
Living people
1959 births
Skyline High School (Dallas) alumni
People from Memphis, Tennessee
People from Dallas